White Native Americans may refer to:
Mestizo, a term used in Central and South America to refer to a person of combined European and Indigenous American descent
Métis, an ethnic group in Canada and parts of the United States of mixed Indigenous North American and European descent
White Amazonian Indians, a group of white-skinned natives spotted in the Amazon Rainforest from the 16th century by Spanish missionaries

See also
Multiracial Americans#Native American identity, multiracial people in the United States with a Native American identity
White Americans#Admixture in Non-Hispanic Whites, White Americans with American Indian ancestry